The Charlos vs. Derevyanchenko and Rosario (also known as the Charlo Doubleheader VIII for the eighth series of both fights involved the Charlo twins (Jermell and Jermall) respectively), was the double-header light middleweight and middleweight professional boxing matches contested for the WBC middleweight title between defending undefeated world champion Jermall Charlo and the three-time world title challenger Sergiy Derevyanchenko, as well as the unified light middleweight titles bout between WBC champion Jermell Charlo and unified WBA (Super) and IBF champion Jeison Rosario. The event took place on September 26, 2020 at the Mohegan Sun Arena, Uncasville, Connecticut.

Fight card

Broadcasters 
The fight was televised live in the USA on Showtime PPV, Latin America (inc. Dominican Republic) on ESPN, and streamed live in Ukraine on XSPORT.

References 

Boxing matches
2020 in boxing
Sports competitions in Uncasville, Connecticut
2020 in sports in Connecticut
September 2020 sports events in the United States
Boxing in Connecticut